Shiner or The Shiner may refer to:

Entertainment and media
 Shiner (2000 film), a 2000 film with Michael Caine
 Shiner (2004 film), a 2004 film by Christian Calson
”The Shiner” is a Season 3 episode of American animated televisions series Recess
 Shiner (band), a band from Kansas City
 Shiners, the fireflies in The Underland Chronicles
 Shiner (comics), fictional character in the UK comic Whizzer and Chips
 Shining With The Shiner and Shiner Slattery, books by John A. Lee in which Edmond Slattery (see below) is a central character

Food and drink
 Shiner beer, a brand of beer brewed in the Spoetzl Brewery of Shiner, Texas
 Shiner, slang for moonshine, a high-proof corn-based alcohol spirit

People
 Shiner (surname)
 "The Shiner",  the nickname of early New Zealand itinerant worker Edmond Slattery

Places
 Shiner, Texas

Other
 Shiner (fish), common name used for any of several kinds of small, usually silvery fish
 Shiner (Ottawa), a street gang of Irish immigrants in Bytown during the early 19th century 
 Shiner, slang for a black eye (a periorbital hematoma)
 Shiner, the internal codename for the Apple Network Server